The Municipality of Ravne na Koroškem is a municipality in the traditional region of Carinthia in northern Slovenia. The seat of the municipality is the town of Ravne na Koroškem. Ravne na Koroškem became a municipality in 1994.

Settlements
In addition to the municipal seat of Ravne na Koroškem, the municipality also includes the following settlements:

 Brdinje
 Dobrije
 Koroški Selovec
 Kotlje
 Navrški Vrh
 Podgora
 Podkraj
 Preški Vrh
 Sele
 Stražišče
 Strojna
 Tolsti Vrh pri Ravnah na Koroškem
 Uršlja Gora
 Zelen Breg

References

External links

Municipality of Ravne na Koroškem on Geopedia
Ravne na Koroškem municipal site

Ravne na Koroškem
1994 establishments in Slovenia